The football tournament at the 1995 Southeast Asian Games was held from 4 to 16 December in Chiang Mai and Lamphun in Thailand.  All 10 Southeast Asian nations joined the football tournament.

Medal winners

Men's tournament

Participants

Squad 
Football at the 1995 Southeast Asian Games – Men's team squads

Group stage

Group A

Group B

Knockout stage

Semi-finals

Bronze medal match

Gold medal match

Winners

Final ranking

Women's tournament

Participants

Group stage

Final

Winners

Final ranking

References 
Stokkermans, Karel. "South East Asian Games 1995 (Thailand)". RSSSF.

SoutheastGames
1995
1995 Southeast Asian Games events
Football at the Southeast Asian Games
1995 in Thai football